Giorgio "Tito" Frinolii (born 12 July 1970) is a former Italian hurdler. He is the son of the 1966 European champion, Roberto Frinolli, and the coach of the Italian sprinter Jessica Paoletta.

Biography
He won one medals, at senior level, at the International athletics competitions. He competed for an Italy in the 400 metres hurdles at the 2000 Summer Olympics. He has 22 caps in national team from 1993 to 2001.

Achievements

National titles
Giorgio Frinolii has won 3 times consecutively the individual national championship.
3 wins in the 400 metres hurdles (1993, 1994, 2000)

See also
 Italian all-time top lists - 400 metres hurdles

References

External links
 

1970 births
Italian male hurdlers
Athletics competitors of Fiamme Azzurre
Athletes (track and field) at the 2000 Summer Olympics
Olympic athletes of Italy
Living people
Italian athletics coaches
Mediterranean Games silver medalists for Italy
Athletes (track and field) at the 1993 Mediterranean Games
World Athletics Championships athletes for Italy
Mediterranean Games medalists in athletics